SK Innovation Co., Ltd. is an intermediate holding company of SK Group engaged in petroleum, alternative energy, and oil exploration. It runs its business through eight major subsidiaries, including SK Energy, SK Geo Centric, SK On, SK Enmove, SK Incheon Petrochem, SK Trading International, SK IE Technology and SK Earthon.

History
SK Energy was established in 2007 by splitting South Korea's top refiner SK Corporation into an energy operation and holding company. SK Energy handled the energy and chemical businesses, while SK Holdings was in charge of investing in subsidiaries and the life science sector.

SK Innovation was created through a restructuring of SK Energy in 2011. The original SK Energy has renamed itself SK Innovation after spinning off its oil refining, lubricants, and chemical businesses. In the beginning, SK Innovation has set up three fully-owned units, including SK Energy (a newly founded company operating crude oil refining business), SK Lubricants (now SK Enmove), and SK Global Chemical (now SK Geo Centric). After two years, SK Innovation spun off SK Energy's Incheon refinery complex and oil trading division and launched SK Incheon Petrochem and SK Trading International.

On March 31, 2017, SK Innovation said that the electric vehicle battery plant it had in China had been closed since January of that year, after "Chinese joint venture partners halted production for no obvious reason." On March 21, 2018, SK Innovation announced the acquisition of U.S. shale oil and gas company Longfellow Nemaha.

In 2019, the company decided to spin off its material division and established SK IE Technology.
On 1 October in 2021, SK Innovation officially completed the spin-off of its battery business, which is called 'SK On'. In the first half of 2022, SK On is ranked fifth in the world with a market share of 7 per cent according to SNE research. In September 2021, Ford and SK Innovation announced a joint venture to manufacture batteries in the Kentucky/Tennessee region for Ford motor vehicles.

Controversies
In 2019, South Korean electric vehicle battery manufacturer LG Chem sued SK Innovation with the U.S. International Trade Commission (ITC) for misappropriation of trade secrets by hiring former employees. LG Chem requested the import ban to the U.S. for SK Innovation's lithium-ion batteries and infrastructure technology from the ITC. The ITC sided with LG Chem and issued a limited 10-year exclusion order prohibiting imports into the United States of some lithium-ion batteries by SK Innovation. In the end, SK Innovation agreed to pay LG Chem $1.8 billion in cash and royalties to avert the import ban.

See also
SK Group
List of electric-vehicle-battery manufacturers
Jeju United FC, a South Korean professional football club owned by SK Energy

References

External links
 

South Korean companies established in 2007
Companies listed on the Korea Exchange
South Korean brands
SK Group subsidiaries
Battery manufacturers
Electric vehicle battery manufacturers